Irukandji may refer to:
Irukandji people or Yirrganydji people, a group of Australian Aborigines
Irukandji jellyfish, a type of small, extremely venomous jellyfish
The Irukandjis, the Australian national surfing team at the Summer Olympics

See also
Irukandji syndrome, resulting from the sting of an Irukandji jellyfish